Hammatoderus albatus is a species of beetle in the family Cerambycidae. It was first described by Henry Walter Bates in 1880. It is known from Panama and Costa Rica.

References

Hammatoderus
Beetles described in 1880